Sun Yiwen (born 17 June 1992) is a Chinese left-handed épée fencer. Sun is a three-time team Asian champion and two-time team world champion.

A two-time Olympian, Sun is a 2016 team Olympic silver medalist, 2016 individual Olympic bronze medalist, and 2021 individual Olympic champion.

In Tokyo, Sun became the first Chinese fencer in history to win an Olympic gold medal in individual women's épée, and only the second Chinese woman to win an Olympic gold medal in an individual fencing event, after Luan Jujie, who won a gold medal in individual women's foil at the 1984 Los Angeles Olympic Games.

During the press conference after her gold medal match, Sun revealed that some time before her departure for Tokyo, she was informed that her father had been diagnosed with cancer and was fighting for his life at a hospital in Beijing.

Medal record

Olympic Games

World Championship

Asian Championship

Grand Prix

World Cup

References

External links
 

1992 births
Living people
Sportspeople from Yantai
Chinese female fencers
Chinese épée fencers
Fencers at the 2020 Summer Olympics
Fencers at the 2016 Summer Olympics
Olympic fencers of China
2016 Olympic silver medalists for China
2016 Olympic bronze medalists for China
Olympic medalists in fencing
Fencers at the 2014 Asian Games
Fencers at the 2018 Asian Games
Asian Games gold medalists for China
Asian Games silver medalists for China
Asian Games medalists in fencing
Medalists at the 2014 Asian Games
Medalists at the 2018 Asian Games
Universiade medalists in fencing
Fencers from Shandong
Universiade silver medalists for China
Medalists at the 2013 Summer Universiade
Olympic gold medalists for China
Medalists at the 2020 Summer Olympics
21st-century Chinese women